The Volocopter VC2  is a German single-place experimental electric multirotor personal air vehicle that was built by Volocopter GmbH (formerly called E-Volo) of Bruchsal, Germany.

Design and development
The VC-2 is the second in a series of multirotor designs from the German company e-volo. The single-place, 16 motor, all-electric e-volo VC1 "Volocopter" was demonstrated on 21 October 2011. The VC2 is the next follow-on with 18 engines suspended around an aluminum truss frame that includes a center-mounted seat, battery, and Battery Management Unit. The proof-of-concept aircraft will be used to develop the E-volo VC Evolution 2P, a two-passenger enclosed volocopter with extended range and weight capabilities.

The VC200 was demonstrated unmanned in November 2013 at an enclosed arena in Karlsruhe, Germany. Two prototypes performed unmanned flight tests, with the first manned flight made on March 30, 2016 by Alexander Zosel.

Specifications

See also
List of rotorcraft

References

External links
 VC2 at Electrical VTOL News

VC2
Multirotor helicopters
Electric helicopters
2010s German ultralight aircraft
2010s German civil utility aircraft
2010s German helicopters
Aircraft first flown in 2011
EVTOL aircraft
Urban air mobility